Sundbybergs IK is a Swedish football club located in Sundbyberg.

Background
Sundbybergs IK, (abbreviated as SIK), is a sports club based in Sundbyberg. The club currently has thirteen sections and around 3000 members catering for the sports of football, athletics, bandy, bowling, gymnastics, floorball, handball, orienteering, swimming, skiing (cross country and slalom), table tennis and general fitness.

The club was formed on 19 April 1893 by a group of youngsters who had gathered at a cafe in Sundbyberg as the result of an initiative by Gustaf Hammarin. The list of those who attended and the minutes of the meeting have been preserved in the club's archives. Sundbybergs IK has played in Sweden's highest bandy league in the 1948, 1951 and 1953 seasons.

The football section was formed in 1904 and its most successful period was from 1924–25 until 1950–51 during which the club spent 17 seasons in Division 2 which at that time was the second tier of Swedish football. The club's most famous player is Stefan Rehn who moved on to Djurgårdens IF, Everton F.C., IFK Göteborg and Lausanne Sports and played 45 times for the Swedish national side.

In 2020 Sundbybergs IK plays in Division 3 Norra Svealand coached by Zoran Lukic. Division 3 is the fifth tier of Swedish football. They play their home matches at the Sundbybergs IP in Sundbyberg.

The club is affiliated to Stockholms Fotbollförbund. The club's women's side played one season in the Damallsvenskan in 2000 but in 2019 they reside in Women's Division 3 Stockholm A.

Season to season

In their most successful period Sundbybergs IK competed in the following divisions:

In recent seasons Sundbybergs IK have competed in the following divisions:

Attendances

In recent seasons Sundbybergs IK have had the following average attendances:

Notable players
  Stefan Rehn

Notable Managers
  Henry Carlsson
  Zoran Lukic

Footnotes

External links
 Sundbybergs IK Fotboll – Official website

Football clubs in Stockholm
1893 establishments in Sweden